Bel Ombre (or Belombre) is an administrative district of Seychelles located on the island of Mahé. It has a small fishing harbour for artesan fishing from small boats with lines.

References

Districts of Seychelles
Mahé, Seychelles